The 1984–85 Atlantic Coast Hockey League season was the fourth season of the Atlantic Coast Hockey League, a North American minor professional league. 

Five teams participated in the regular season, which was one less team that participated in the 1983-84 season. The Birmingham Bulls took part in the 1983-84 season but did not return for the 1984-85 ACHL season. They were evicted from their arena after three games and officially folded the franchise two weeks after their eviction. 

The Carolina Thunderbirds led the league in regular season points (107) and won the Bob Paine Trophy as league champions. The 1984-85 season would be the final season of the Pinebridge Bucks.

Regular season

Playoffs

Statistics

Scoring leaders
Regular season

External links
 Season 1984/85 on hockeydb.com

Atlantic Coast Hockey League seasons
ACHL